Ripa Teatina is a comune and town in the province of Chieti, in the Italian region Abruzzo. Ripa Teatina is renowned for its vineyards and olive groves which surround and embrace this tranquil part of Abruzzo.

People

The father of boxing World Champion Rocky Marciano, Pierino Marchegiano, immigrated to the United States from Ripa Teatina in 1912.
Rocky Mattioli is another boxer from Ripa Teatina, born in 1953.

Twin towns

 Brockton, Massachusetts, USA
 Sequals, Italy
 San Bartolomeo in Galdo, Italy
 Ribeirão Preto, Brazil

References

Cities and towns in Abruzzo